Coelotrochus is a genus of small sea snails, marine gastropod mollusks in the family Trochidae, the top snails.

Description
The false umbilicus is very deep and narrow, penetrating deeper than the columella, which is inserted upon its edge, not in the centre of the axis.

Distribution
This marine genus is endemic to New Zealand.

Species
Species within the genus Coelotrochus include:
 † Coelotrochus avarus (Suter, 1917)
 † Coelotrochus bibaphus (Bartrum & Powell, 1928)
 † Coelotrochus browni (C. A. Fleming, 1943)
 Coelotrochus carinatus (B. A. Marshall, 1998)
 Coelotrochus carmesinus (Webster, 1908)
 Coelotrochus chathamensis (Hutton, 1873)
 Coelotrochus davegibbsi (B. A. Marshall, 1998)
 † Coelotrochus fossilis (Finlay, 1926) 
 † Coelotrochus gracilis (Laws, 1936)
 Coelotrochus oppressus (B. A. Marshall, 1998)
 Coelotrochus polychromus (B. A. Marshall, 1998)
 Coelotrochus rex (B. A. Marshall, 1998)
 Coelotrochus tiaratus (Quoy & Gaimard, 1834)
 Coelotrochus viridis (Gmelin, 1791)

References

 Nomenclator Zoologicus info
 Image of the holotype of the species, N.Z. government site
 Williams S.T., Donald K.M., Spencer H.G. & Nakano T. (2010) Molecular systematics of the marine gastropod families Trochidae and Calliostomatidae (Mollusca: Superfamily Trochoidea). Molecular Phylogenetics and Evolution 54:783-809.

External links
 Iredale T. (1915). A commentary on Suter's Manual of the New Zealand Mollusca. Transactions and Proceedings of the New Zealand Institute. 47: 417-497

 
Trochidae
Gastropods of New Zealand
Gastropod genera